Broad Street United Methodist Church may refer to:

 Broad Street United Methodist Church (Columbus, Ohio), listed on the National Register of Historic Places (NRHP)
 Broad Street United Methodist Church (Cleveland, Tennessee), also NRHP-listed